Ivan Tyurin (born 21 May 1997) is a Ukrainian professional footballer who plays as a goalkeeper for 2. liga club Tatran Prešov.

Career 
On 8 April 2022, Tyurin signed for French side Rumilly-Vallières.

Notes

References

External links 

 

1997 births
Living people
Footballers from Kyiv
Ukrainian footballers
Association football goalkeepers
FC Dnipro players
FC Obolon-Brovar Kyiv players
FC Obolon-2 Kyiv players
FC Epitsentr Dunaivtsi players
GFA Rumilly-Vallières players
1. FC Tatran Prešov players
Ukrainian First League players
Ukrainian Second League players
Ukrainian expatriate footballers
Expatriate footballers in France
Ukrainian expatriate sportspeople in France
Expatriate footballers in Slovakia
Ukrainian expatriate sportspeople in Slovakia